Carl Fred Sainté (born 9 August 2002), sometimes nicknamed Tatou, is a Haitian professional footballer who plays as a midfielder for the MLS Next Pro club North Texas SC, and the Haiti national team.

Club career
Sainté is a youth product of the Haitian clubs AGE-Foot, ASGG, and finally Violette who he joined in 2019. He began his senior career with Violette and helped them win the 2020–21 Ligue Haïtienne. He transferred to the American club New Mexico United on 22 December 2021. He debuted with New Mexico United in a 2–0 USL Championship win over Las Vegas Lights on 14 March 2022, coming on as a late sub in the 87th minute.

International career
Sainté represented the Haiti U17s at the 2019 FIFA U-17 World Cup. He was called up to represent the senior Haiti national team in March 2022. He debuted with the Haiti national team in a friendly 2–1 loss to Guatemala on 27 March 2022.

Honours
Violette AC
Ligue Haïtienne: 2020–21

References

External links
 
 DFB Profile

2002 births
Living people
People from Ouest (department)
Haitian footballers
Haiti international footballers
Haiti youth international footballers
Association football midfielders
New Mexico United players
Ligue Haïtienne players
USL Championship players
Haitian expatriate footballers
Haitian expatriates in the United States
Expatriate soccer players in the United States
North Texas SC players
MLS Next Pro players